Stevens County is a county in the U.S. state of Minnesota. As of the 2020 census, the population was 9,671. Its county seat is Morris.

History
The county was created by act of the Minnesota legislature on February 20, 1862. It was not organized at that time, and no county seat was named. The county was named for Isaac Stevens, who had led a railroad survey party across Minnesota in 1853 and was influential in bringing national attention to the Minnesota Territory. The territorial legislature had intended to thus honor Stevens in 1855 when another county was being created, but a clerical error caused that county to be named Stearns. The error was corrected by the 1862 act; by that time Stevens was a brigadier general for the Union Army in the American Civil War. Stevens was killed later that year. The county government was organized in 1872. Morris, which had been platted in 1869, was named the county seat.

The University of Minnesota Morris is in Morris. It was developed in the early 20th century from the Morris Industrial School for Indians, which opened in 1887 and was originally operated by the Roman Catholic Sisters of Mercy under contract to the federal government.

In 1975, a moderate earthquake occurred in the county.

Geography
The Pomme de Terre River flows south through central Stevens County, on its way to discharge into the Minnesota River. The county's terrain consists of rolling hills, with the area mostly devoted to agriculture. The terrain generally slopes to the south, although the northeast and southwest portions rise from the central part of the county. The county's highest point is on the eastern portion of the northern border, at 1,250' (381m) ASL.

Major highways

  U.S. Highway 59
  Minnesota State Highway 9
  Minnesota State Highway 28
  Minnesota State Highway 329

Adjacent counties

 Grant County - north
 Douglas County - northeast
 Pope County - east
 Swift County - south
 Big Stone County - southwest
 Traverse County - northwest

Protected areas

 Alberta Marsh State Wildlife Management Area
 Boekholt Grove State Wildlife Management Area
 Bruillet State Wildlife Management Area
 Cin State Wildlife Management Area
 Dablow State Wildlife Management Area
 Dolven State Wildlife Management Area
 Everglade State Wildlife Management Area
 Klason State Wildlife Management Area
 Kline State Wildlife Management Area
 Mathison State Wildlife Management Area
 Muddy Creek State Wildlife Management Area
 Reimers State Wildlife Management Area
 Robertson State Wildlife Management Area
 Selk State Wildlife Management Area
 Thedin State Wildlife Management Area
 Verlyn Marth Memorial Prairie Scientific and Natural Area

Demographics

2000 census
As of the 2000 census, there were 10,053 people, 3,751 households, and 2,366 families in the county. The population density was 17.8/sqmi (6.88/km2). There were 4,074 housing units at an average density of 7.22/sqmi (2.79/km2). The racial makeup of the county was 96.13% White, 0.92% Black or African American, 0.70% Native American, 0.86% Asian, 0.02% Pacific Islander, 0.38% from other races, and 1.00% from two or more races. 0.90% of the population were Hispanic or Latino of any race. 44.8% were of German, 20.8% Norwegian and 5.4% Irish ancestry.

There were 3,751 households, out of which 28.60% had children under the age of 18 living with them, 55.40% were married couples living together, 5.10% had a female householder with no husband present, and 36.90% were non-families. 29.10% of all households were made up of individuals, and 14.20% had someone living alone who was 65 years of age or older. The average household size was 2.43 and the average family size was 2.99.

The county population contained 21.60% under the age of 18, 20.80% from 18 to 24, 21.60% from 25 to 44, 19.00% from 45 to 64, and 17.00% who were 65 years of age or older. The median age was 34 years. For every 100 females there were 93.90 males. For every 100 females age 18 and over, there were 91.00 males.

The median income for a household in the county was $37,267, and the median income for a family was $47,518. Males had a median income of $32,045 versus $21,681 for females. The per capita income for the county was $17,569. About 5.70% of families and 13.60% of the population were below the poverty line, including 6.50% of those under age 18 and 11.30% of those age 65 or over.

2020 Census

Communities

Cities

 Alberta
 Chokio
 Donnelly
 Hancock
 Morris (county seat)

Townships

 Baker Township
 Darnen Township
 Donnelly Township
 Eldorado Township
 Everglade Township
 Framnas Township
 Hodges Township
 Horton Township
 Moore Township
 Morris Township
 Pepperton Township
 Rendsville Township
 Scott Township
 Stevens Township
 Swan Lake Township
 Synnes Township

Government and politics
Stevens County has been a swing district for the past several decades. As of 2020 it has selected the Republican candidate in 56% of presidential elections since 1980.

See also 
 National Register of Historic Places listings in Stevens County, Minnesota

References

External links
 Stevens County government’s website
 Stevens County Historical Society & Museum

 
Minnesota counties
1862 establishments in Minnesota
Populated places established in 1862